The Cathedral of Saints Peter and Paul in Basankusu, or simply Basankusu Cathedral, is a parish church of the Roman Catholic Church in Basankusu, Équateur Province in the northwestern part of the Democratic Republic of the Congo. It is the mother church of the Diocese of Basankusu and seat of the Bishop of Basankusu, currently Joseph Mokobe Ndjoku.

The first church was built during the colonial era between 1939 and 1942 by Jan de Koning and the Saint Joseph's Missionary Society (Mill Hill Missionaries), in what was then the Apostolic Prefecture of Basankusu. It was elevated to cathedral status in 1959, with its elevation to diocesan status through the bull "Cum parvulum" of Pope John XXIII.

In 2012, this structure was demolished and rebuilt to a very similar design, using reinforced concrete in place of kiln-fired brick. Bishop Mokobe presided over the inauguration of the new building in October 2018.

See also
Catholic Church in the Democratic Republic of the Congo

References

Roman Catholic cathedrals in the Democratic Republic of the Congo
Roman Catholic churches completed in 2018
1942 establishments in the Belgian Congo
Christian organizations established in 1939